Catocala dulciola, the quiet underwing or sweet underwing, is a moth of the family Erebidae. The species was first described by Augustus Radcliffe Grote in 1881. It is found in the United States from New York through Virginia, west to Missouri and north to Illinois and Michigan.

The wingspan is 40–45 mm. Adults are on wing from June to July depending on the location. There is probably one generation per year.

The larvae feed on Crataegus.

References

External links
Species info

Moths described in 1881
dulciola
Moths of North America